The Confession is a 1999 American drama film directed by David Hugh Jones, starring Ben Kingsley and Alec Baldwin. It is based on the novel by Sol Yurick.

Plot
After his young son dies from the negligence of medical professionals at a hospital, Harry Fertig (Kingsley) takes matters into his own hands and kills the negligent doctors responsible. Slick lawyer Roy Bleakie (Baldwin), looking only to win a case and not caring of the matters involved, is assigned Fertig's case. Shocked to hear that his client wants to plead guilty, the case causes Bleakie to question his own morals by defending an honorable man.

Cast
Alec Baldwin as Roy Bleakie
Ben Kingsley as Harry Fertig  
Amy Irving as Sarah Fertig 
Boyd Gaines as Liam Clarke  
Anne Twomey as Judge Judy Crossland
Richard Jenkins as Coss O'Donell
Kevin Conway as Mel Duden
Jay O. Sanders as Jack Renoble
Chris Noth as Campuso

Production
Filming took place largely in Brooklyn and Manhattan, New York.

References

External links 
 
 

1999 films
1999 drama films
Films based on American novels
Films directed by David Jones
Films scored by Mychael Danna
Films produced by Elie Samaha
American drama films
1990s English-language films
1990s American films
English-language drama films